El Borma is a town and commune, which is coextensive with El Borma District, in Algeria. According to the 2008 census it has a population of 3,250, up from 1,997 in 1998. and an annual population growth rate of 4.9%, the second highest in the province. The town is located on the border with Tataouine Governorate, Tunisia.

Geography 

El Borma is located amidst the vast sand dunes of the Grand Erg Oriental in eastern Algeria. The location is notable for its underground petroleum reservoirs.

Climate 
El Borma has a hot desert climate (Köppen climate classification BWh) with long, extremely hot summers and short, warm winters. The climate is similar to the one of Ouargla. Daytime temperatures are soaring during summer months as they consistently turn around 45 °C (113 °F) between June and September.

Economy 

El Borma's economy is supported by the petroleum industry, due to the oil fields in the area. Grazing is also significant, although limited because of the marginal plant life in the area. Agriculture is currently unfeasible due to the lack of sufficient water supplies.

Transportation 

El Borma is an isolated town, with no significant settlements or major roads nearby.

The town is served by El Borma Airport.

Education

1.6% of the population has a tertiary education (the lowest in the province), and another 3.5% has completed secondary education. The overall literacy rate is 42.6%, and is 54.7% among males and 28.5% among females. All three rates are the lowest in the province.

Localities 

The commune is composed of eight localities:

 El Borma
 Rhoud El Baguel
 El Masder
 Bordj Saïf Fatima
 Bordj Bir El Djedid
 Bordj Bir Larache
 Keskassa
 Erg Yagoub

References

Notes

Neighbouring towns and cities

Communes of Ouargla Province
Districts of Ouargla Province
Ouargla Province